Pablo is a census-designated place (CDP) in Lake County, Montana, United States. The population was 2,254 at the 2010 census, up from 1,814 in 2000. It is the home of Salish Kootenai College and the seat of government of the Flathead Indian Reservation.

History

Pablo got its start in 1917, when the Northern Pacific Railway completed a branch line between Dixon and Polson. It takes its name from Michel Pablo, known for his efforts to save the American bison from extinction.

People's Center fire
On September 6, 2020, an arsonist set fire to the People's Center, an education center and museum space for Flathead history and culture. The center lost its repository room, offices, and commercial room were lost in the blaze, but the foyer, education room, and museum area survived. Much of the surviving collection has presently been moved to the Dr. Joe McDonald Health and Activity Center, which resides on the campus of Salish Kootenai College.

The suspect, a 33-year-old male, died at the scene. Doors had been barricaded from within, resulting in an increased difficulty for the firefighters at the scene.

Geography
Pablo is located in central Lake County at  (47.601740, -114.116817). U.S. Route 93 passes through Pablo, east of the town center. The highway leads north  to Polson, the county seat, and south  to Ronan. It is near Pablo National Wildlife Refuge.

Climate
This climatic region is typified by large seasonal temperature differences, with warm to hot (and often humid) summers and cold (sometimes severely cold) winters.  According to the Köppen Climate Classification system, Pablo has a humid continental climate, abbreviated "Dfb" on climate maps.

Demographics

As of the census of 2000, there were 1,814 people, 622 households, and 475 families residing in the CDP. The population density was 372.5 people per square mile (143.8/km). There were 674 housing units at an average density of 138.4 per square mile (53.4/km). The racial makeup of the CDP was 51.16% Native American, 43.44% White, 0.17% African American, 0.11% Asian, 0.06% Pacific Islander, 0.72% from other races, and 4.36% from two or more races. Hispanic or Latino of any race were 3.31% of the population.

There were 622 households, out of which 47.7% had children under the age of 18 living with them, 45.2% were married couples living together, 22.7% had a female householder with no husband present, and 23.5% were non-families. 20.4% of all households were made up of individuals, and 6.4% had someone living alone who was 65 years of age or older. The average household size was 2.89 and the average family size was 3.27.

In the CDP, the population was spread out, with 38.5% under the age of 18, 9.9% from 18 to 24, 27.9% from 25 to 44, 17.0% from 45 to 64, and 6.7% who were 65 years of age or older. The median age was 26 years. For every 100 females, there were 90.3 males. For every 100 females age 18 and over, there were 86.8 males.

The median income for a household in the CDP was $26,771, and the median income for a family was $28,615. Males had a median income of $20,982 versus $19,907 for females. The per capita income for the CDP was $14,672. About 22.7% of families and 28.1% of the population were below the poverty line, including 30.2% of those under age 18 and 9.2% of those age 65 or over.

Education
Pablo is home to Salish Kootenai College, a tribally controlled college chartered in 1977. It became independent of the local community college in 1981 and has expanded its programs. It offers both two-year and four-year degrees, and serves three satellite campuses in eastern Washington state.

The community is also home to Pablo Elementary School and Two Eagle River School. Two Eagle River School is a Class C high school (less than 108 students) which helps determine athletic competitions. They are known as the Eagles.

References

Seats of government of American Indian reservations
Census-designated places in Lake County, Montana
Census-designated places in Montana